The play-offs of the 2023 UEFA European Under-21 Championship qualifying competition involve eight of the nine runners-up in the qualifying group stage, the top-ranked team being directly qualified for the tournament.

Ranking of second-placed teams

Draw

The draw for the play-offs was held on 21 June 2022 in Nyon, Switzerland.

Summary

The four play-off winners qualify for the final tournament.

|}

Matches
All times are CEST (UTC+2), as listed by UEFA (local times, if different, are in parentheses).

3–3 on aggregate. Croatia won 5–4 on penalties and qualified for the 2023 UEFA European Under-21 Championship.

Ukraine won 5–3 on aggregate and qualified for the 2023 UEFA European Under-21 Championship.

1–1 on aggregate. Israel won 3–1 on penalties and qualified for the 2023 UEFA European Under-21 Championship.

Czech Republic won 2–1 on aggregate and qualified for the 2023 UEFA European Under-21 Championship.

Goalscorers

References

External links
Fixtures at UEFA.com

Play-offs
UEFA European Under-21 Championship qualification play-offs